Oscar Alain Eyobo Makongo  (born 17 October 1961 in Douala) is a retired Cameroonian professional football forward. He played for multiple clubs throughout Africa and Europe.

Club career
Eyobo played for Dynamo Douala in Cameroon. He had a brief spell with Boluspor in the Turkish Super Lig.

Eyobo played in the CONCACAF Champions' Cup 1995 with CS Moulien of Guadeloupe, who reached but finished last in the final round.

International career
Eyobo played for the full Cameroon national football team. He was included in the squad at the 1982 FIFA World Cup finals, but did not appear in any matches.

Eyobo also played at the 1981 FIFA World Youth Championship in Australia.

References

1961 births
Living people
Footballers from Douala
Cameroonian footballers
Cameroonian expatriate footballers
Cameroon under-20 international footballers
Cameroon international footballers
1982 FIFA World Cup players
1984 African Cup of Nations players
Africa Cup of Nations-winning players
Süper Lig players
Boluspor footballers
Expatriate footballers in Turkey
Cameroonian expatriate sportspeople in Turkey
Expatriate footballers in Guadeloupe
CS Moulien players
Association football forwards
Cameroonian expatriate sportspeople in Guadeloupe